The 1850 Montgomeryshire by-election to the Parliament of the United Kingdom was held on 11 October 1850 after the death of the incumbent Conservative MP Charles Williams-Wynn.  It was retained by the Conservative candidate Herbert Watkin Williams-Wynn, who was elected unopposed.

Result

He went on to be re-elected unopposed until his own death in 1862.

References

1850 elections in the United Kingdom
1850 in Wales
1850s elections in Wales
Unopposed by-elections to the Parliament of the United Kingdom in Welsh constituencies
October 1850 events